Desirée Sarah Schumann (born 6 February 1990 in Berlin) is a German retired football goalkeeper.

Career
Her career began at the Berlin-based club VfB Hermsdorf. On April 20, 2006, she made her debut in the German under 17 national team. She then moved to Potsdam for the 2006–07 season and played mostly in the reserve team who plays in the second division. On November 11, 2007, Schumann made her debut in the first team in a Bundesliga match against arch rivals 1. FFC Frankfurt.

In April 2011 she announced her transfer to FFC Frankfurt.

Honours

1. FFC Turbine Potsdam
Bundesliga: Winner 2008–09, 2009–10, 2010–11
 DFB-Hallenpokal for women: Winner 2008, 2009, 2010
UEFA Women's Champions League: Winner 2009–10
1. FFC Frankfurt
DFB-Pokal: Winner 2013–14
UEFA Women's Champions League: Winner 2014–15

National team

FIFA U-20 Women's World Cup: Winner 2010

References

External links
 Official homepage of 1. FFC Turbine Potsdam
 

1990 births
Living people
German women's footballers
1. FFC Turbine Potsdam players
1. FFC Frankfurt players
Footballers from Berlin
Women's association football goalkeepers